24th Street may refer to:
24th Street (San Diego Trolley station), San Diego, California
North 24th Street, Omaha, Nebraska
South Omaha Main Street Historic District, aka South 24th Street, Omaha, Nebraska
24th Street (Manhattan), New York, New York
24th Street (PTC station), Philadelphia, Pennsylvania

See also
24th Street Mission (BART station)
24th Street and Washington Street and 24th Street and Jefferson Street (Metro Light Rail station), Phoenix, Arizona